Belleair is a town in Pinellas County, Florida, United States. As of the 2010 census, it had a population of 3,869.

History 

Belleair traces its origins to 1896 as a planned resort town with the construction of the Belleview Hotel by railroad tycoon Henry B. Plant. Originally known as Belleair Heights, the village consisted of a few dozen homes, livestock stables, and a famed 200-seat coliseum where bicycle races and political rallies were held. Over 300 acres of land were cleared and streets platted. However, real estate development in the community did not meet expectations, and the population remained small. The former village of Belleair Heights fizzled out in the mid-20th century as urban sprawl blurred the lines between communities; the area stopped being referred to as Belleair Heights during the 1930s. Following the acquisition of the hotel by the John McEntee Bowman's Biltmore corporation in 1919, management began purchasing large tracts of land south of the resort. The Florida Land Boom was in full swing in 1924 when the company's Vice President and hotel manager Earl E. Carley announced a new real estate venture of Belleair Estates. 

Belleair Estates was designed by famed landscape architect John Nolen and was intended as Florida's most exclusive winter residential colony. The town initially incorporated in late 1924, though was re-incorporated in 1925 under the current name of Belleair.  Development continued until the real estate bubble burst in 1926 which subsequently aided in the national Great Depression three years later. Following World War II, Belleair began to develop in earnest, with over two-thirds of the town's residences built after 1950.

The Eagles Nest Japanese Gardens, a popular tourist attraction in the town, opened in 1938 and closed in 1952.

Geography

Form of government
The Town of Belleair has a Commission-Manager form of government.  The Interim Town Manager is Rick Doyle. The current mayor and commissioners are:

Mayor – Michael Wilkinson
Deputy Mayor – Tom Kurey
Commissioner – Tom Shelly
Commissioner – Coleen Chaney
Commissioner – Thomas Nessler

Demographics

At the 2000 census there were 4,067 people, 1,973 households, and 1,225 families in the town. The population density was 2,265.8 inhabitants per square mile (877.2/km). The racial makeup of the town was 98.35% White, 0.15% African American, 0.15% Native American, 0.39% Asian, 0.20% from other races, and 0.76% from two or more races. Hispanic or Latino of any race were 2.53%.

Of the 1,973 households 17.9% had children under the age of 18 living with them, 55.1% were married couples living together, 5.4% had a female householder with no husband present, and 37.9% were non-families. 34.2% of households were one person and 21.3% were one person aged 65 or older.  The average household size was 2.04 and the average family size was 2.58.

The age distribution was 16.2% under the age of 18, 2.5% from 18 to 24, 20.1% from 25 to 44, 28.5% from 45 to 64, and 32.6% 65 or older.  The median age was 53 years. For every 100 females, there were 84.7 males.  For every 100 females age 18 and over, there were 79.1 males.

The median household income was $63,267 and the median family income was $96,400. Males had a median income of $61,548 versus $31,313 for females. The per capita income for the town was $59,164.  About 1.4% of families and 4.0% of the population were below the poverty line, including 2.7% of those under age 18 and 4.4% of those age 65 or over.

Notable people
Mary R. Grizzle, Florida state legislator
Hulk Hogan, professional wrestler and reality television star
Nigel Mansell, Formula One and CART driver
Dean Young, cartoonist of Blondie

References

External links
 Town of Belleair, Florida Website

Towns in Pinellas County, Florida
Populated places on the Intracoastal Waterway in Florida